John Hubbard (27 October 1931 – 27 November 1980) was a British physicist, best known for the Hubbard model for interacting electrons, the Hubbard–Stratonovich transformation, and the Hubbard approximations. He graduated from Imperial College London, receiving a B.Sc. (1955) and a Ph.D. degree (1958).

He was the Head of the Solid State Theory Group at the Atomic Energy Research Establishment in Harwell (England), and worked at the IBM Research Laboratory in San Jose, California (1976–1980).

References

External links
 Biography by A. L. Kuzemsky, 2006. 
 
 John Hubbard 1931–1980 by David Thouless, 18 June 2013

1931 births
1980 deaths
Alumni of Imperial College London
IBM employees
British physicists